Keyi Look Cycling Team is a Chinese UCI Continental cycling team established in 2016.

2017 Team roster

References

UCI Continental Teams (Asia)
Cycling teams established in 2016
Cycling teams based in China